Khetwadi Vidhan Sabha seat was one of the seats in Maharashtra Legislative Assembly in India. It was made defunct after constituency map of India was redrawn in 2008.

Members of Legislative Assembly

Election Results

1972 Assembly Election
 Anant Namjoshi (INC) : 29,075 votes    
 Lakhani Jivanlal Mulchand (BJS) : 9171

1980 Assembly Election
 Sharma, Premkumar Shankardatt (BJP) : 18,475 votes    
 Qureshi M. Ismail Abdul Karim (INC-I) : 18335

2004 Assembly Election
 Ashok Arjunrao Alias Bhai Jagtap (INC) : 23,650 votes  
 Atul Shah (BJP) : 19876 votes

See also 
 List of constituencies of Maharashtra Legislative Assembly

References 

Former assembly constituencies of Maharashtra